

Events

February events
 February 8 – The Midland Railway of England opens its extension to Birmingham New Street station.
 February 12 – The Kansas City, Clinton and Springfield Railway is incorporated in Missouri.
 February 17 – The Southern Pacific Railroad and Central Pacific Railroad are combined under a single holding company, the Southern Pacific Company.

April events
 April 1 – The Southern Pacific Railroad takes over operations of the Central Pacific Railroad.
 April 6 – The Meriden and Cromwell Railroad, a Connecticut predecessor of the New York, New Haven & Hartford Railroad, opens.

June events
 June – John J. Hagerman gains control of Colorado Midland.

July events
 July 19 – The Zanesville and Ohio River Railway enters receivership.
 July 20
 The Hull & Barnsley Railway opens in Yorkshire, England. It is intended to challenge the near-monopoly on export coal traffic in its region of the North Eastern Railway.
 Opening of first railway in Vietnam, Saigon to Mỹ Tho.

August events
 August – International Railway Congress Association established in Brussels to provide an international forum for technical discussion.

November events

 November – First train crosses Garabit viaduct in the Massif Central of France.
 November 6 – Phase 3 of the Novara–Varallo railway in Italy opens connecting Grignasco to Borgosesia.
 November 7 – The last spike on the Canadian Pacific Railway is driven at Craigellachie, British Columbia, Canada.
 November 9 – The last spike is driven on the California Southern Railroad between Barstow and San Bernardino through Cajon Pass, completing the connection to the Atlantic and Pacific Railroad.
 November 12 – The first train to travel the entire route of California Southern Railroad's track through Cajon Pass carries rails from Barstow to Riverside.
 November 17 – The first through train from Chicago via Santa Fe lines arrives in San Diego.
 November 29 – The Atchison, Topeka and Santa Fe Railway leases trackage rights over the Southern Pacific Railroad from San Bernardino to Los Angeles at $1,200 per mile per year.

Unknown date events
 Cornelius Vanderbilt II is promoted to president of the New York Central system.
 The New Zealand Government Railways become the first major railway to place a 2-6-2 steam locomotive into service, having ordered ten V class from Nasmyth, Wilson & Company of Manchester, England.

Births

Unknown date births 
 Richard M. Dilworth, General Motors Electro-Motive Division chief engineer credited with developing the diesel-electric locomotive concept in the 1930s (d. 1968).

Deaths

January deaths
 January 12 – John B. Jervis, Chief mechanical engineer of the Mohawk & Hudson Railroad, pioneer of the use of the leading truck on steam locomotives (b. 1795).

July deaths
 July 31 – Robert F. Fairlie, Scottish steam locomotive builder (b. 1831).

December deaths
 December 6 – Robert Gerwig, German civil engineer, designer of the Schwarzwaldbahn and the Höllentalbahn in the Black Forest (b. 1820).
 December 8 – William Henry Vanderbilt, son of Cornelius Vanderbilt and president of the New York Central system (b. 1821).

References
 Dodge, Richard V.; San Diego Railroad Museum (March 5, 2000), Perris and its Railroad.  Retrieved November 8, 2005.
 (1902), Ohio Railway Report.  Retrieved July 18, 2005.
 Santa Fe Railroad (1945), Along Your Way, Rand McNally, Chicago, Illinois.